The Baltimore Theatre Project is a performing arts center located at 45 West Preston Street in Baltimore, Maryland.

Early years
The Baltimore Theatre Project was founded in 1971 by Philip Arnoult as an appendage to Antioch University. Such diverse theatre companies as Pilobolus Dance Theater, Urban Bush Women, Bread and Puppet Theatre, Studio Scarabee, the IOWA Theatre Lab,  and Spider Woman Theatre were invited to perform throughout the 1970s. Arnoult also established community outreach programs such as the Baltimore Neighborhood Arts Circus and Baltimore Voices.  Theatre Project was a co-producer of The New Theatre (TNT) Festivals at the University of Maryland, Baltimore County  and downtown Baltimore (1976–1979). Early in the 1980s, the theatre's association with Antioch ended, thus making it impossible to continue offering free performances to the public.

1983 to Present
In 1983, the Baltimore Theatre Project began an extensive renovation of its mainstage space, modernizing its facility with the addition of chair lifts providing handicapped accessibility, as well as redesigning its performing and audience spaces. In 1992, Theatre Project came under the direction of Robert Mrozek. During his tenure, such artists as Karen Finley; Danny Hoch; Holly Hughes; James Magruder; da da kamera's Daniel McIvor; Squonk Opera; and David Drake have performed for Baltimore audiences.

In the fall of 2001, directorship of the Baltimore Theatre Project was turned over to Anne Cantler Fulwiler, whose background included work in New York City for companies such as Meredith Monk/The House Foundation and Obie Award-winning MCC Theater. Her tenure has seen performances from local companies such as, Blue Rose Theatre, Run of The Mill, Air Dance Bernasconi and national hits, such as Jacksonville playwright and slam poet Al Letson.

She has also had a partnership between the Theatre Project and Spur Designs during most of her time with the theater, with Spur providing poster designs for the subscription shows, including their poster for the silent production of Romeo and Juliet. The Theatre often works together with local restaurants and businesses such as Soup's On, Sylvan Beach ice cream factory, and Zodiac Restaurant. In late 2009, Theatre Project became a recipient of stimulus funding from the Mid Atlantic Arts Foundation as part of the national stimulus project to fund the arts.

References
"The Corner Theatre as a Cultural Oasis: Or will Yosemite Sam Find Happiness In The Vast Sahara Desert?" Performance, Baltimore's Weekly Newspaper on July 13, 1972 (Vol I, #5)

1971 establishments in Maryland
Culture of Baltimore
Midtown, Baltimore
Theatre companies in Maryland
Theatres in Baltimore
Tourist attractions in Baltimore County, Maryland